Alan William John Stevenson (born 2 October 1962) is a Scottish former cricketer.

Stevenson was born at Coatbridge and was educated in the town at Coatbridge High School. A club cricketer for Drumpellier Cricket Club, Stevenson made his debut for Scotland in a first-class match against Ireland at Dublin in 1985. He would make two further first-class appearances against Ireland in 1986 and 1987, taking 11 wickets with his off break bowling at an average of 20.45, with best figures of 4 for 18. In addition to playing first-class cricket for Scotland, Stevenson also played List A one-day cricket between 1985 and 1987, making seven appearances against English county opponents in the Benson & Hedges Cup and the NatWest Trophy. As a bowler, he struggled in one-day cricket, taking just 3 wickets at an expensive average of 65.66. Outside of cricket, Stevenson was by profession an electronics technician.

References

External links
 

1962 births
Living people
Sportspeople from Coatbridge
People educated at Coatbridge High School
Scottish cricketers